Robin R. Yount (born September 16, 1955), nicknamed "the Kid", and "Rockin' Robin", is an American former professional baseball player. He spent his entire 20-year career in Major League Baseball as a shortstop and center fielder for the Milwaukee Brewers (1974–93).

Yount was drafted in 1973 and advanced to the major leagues one year later at the age of 18. He won two American League Most Valuable Player awards. In 1982, he led the Brewers to a World Series appearance. Yount was elected to the Baseball Hall of Fame in 1999 in his first year of eligibility. Since his retirement as a player, he has held several roles as a baseball coach.

Early life
Yount was born September 16, 1955 in Danville, Illinois. He lived briefly in Covington, Indiana, then his family moved to southern California when he was an infant; his father got a job testing rocket engines with Rocketdyne. Robin attended William Howard Taft High School in Woodland Hills.

Playing career

Early years
Yount was the third pick overall in the June 1973 Major League Baseball draft, one slot ahead of fellow Hall of Famer and 3,000 hit club member Dave Winfield.  Yount made his major league debut the following April, at 18 years old.  After going hitless in his first four games, Yount hit a game-winning home run in his sixth. Yount is currently the last 18-year-old to hit a home run in the Major Leagues (Andruw Jones, Mike Trout, Bryce Harper, and Juan Soto are the most recent teenagers to have hit Major League home runs, but did so as 19-year-olds).  On September 14, 1975 (two days before his 20th birthday), Yount broke Mel Ott's 47-year-old record for most games played in the major leagues before turning 20.

Yount courted controversy in the winter of 1978. He threatened to retire from the game and take up professional golf rather than be underpaid or moved to the outfield by the Brewers. Early in the season, Paul Molitor was called up from the Brewers Class A affiliate to the major league team because of Yount's absence. Yount's demands were met; when he returned to the team, Molitor was moved from shortstop to second base to make room for Yount.

He was an early proponent of weight training – then uncommon in baseball – and by 1980 Yount's power hitting had improved, particularly for a shortstop. Yount was an All-Star in 1980, 1982, and 1983. No other Brewer was voted a starter in consecutive years until Ryan Braun started each year between 2008 and 2011.

1982 season

Yount led the American League with 210 hits in 1982. The 1982 AL East race was tied on the final day of the season, with the race coming down to a winner-take-all game between the Brewers and the Baltimore Orioles. With the title on the line, Yount hit home runs in each of his first two at-bats against Orioles starter Jim Palmer. Yount finished with a four-hit game, as the Brewers won 10-2. In addition to his only 200-hit season, he registered career highs with 29 home runs, 114 RBI, and a .331 batting average (.001 behind the league leader, Willie Wilson). Yount finished with a .578 slugging percentage and .957 OPS on his way to gaining 367 total bases – leading the major leagues in all three categories. His slugging percentage was the second highest ever by a shortstop, and his 129 runs set the record for that position.

That year, Yount also won his only Gold Glove Award and his first Most Valuable Player Award. His performance garnered 27 of 28 possible first place votes in the 1982 MVP balloting. The year ended with the Brewers making their only World Series appearance.  Although Yount became the only player in history to have two 4-hit games in one World Series, Milwaukee lost to the St. Louis Cardinals in seven games. Yount batted .414 in the Series, with one home run and 6 RBI.

Later career
In 1985, a shoulder problem forced Yount to move to the outfield. After splitting time between center field and left field, Yount became the Brewers' regular center fielder in 1986. He played more than 1,200 games in the outfield in his career, with a .990 fielding percentage. He made a game-ending, diving catch to preserve a no-hitter by Juan Nieves early in the 1987 season.

Yount narrowly won a second MVP Award in 1989, making him only the third player to win MVPs at two positions, joining Hank Greenberg and Stan Musial (Alex Rodriguez would later join this group). Yount was the first AL player to win multiple MVP awards in over 25 years, since the Yankees' Roger Maris (1960 and 1961) and Mickey Mantle (1956, 1957, and 1962). Yount collected more hits (1,731) in the decade of the 1980s than any other player.

After the 1989 season, Yount was a free agent and he spoke with several teams about contract offers. The California Angels were prepared to make a serious offer, but Yount signed a three-year contract with the Brewers worth $9.6 million in February 1990. In 1991, Yount was briefly on the disabled list (DL) with a kidney stone, only the second stint on the DL in his career; the first one was in 1978.

On September 9, 1992, Yount collected his 3,000th career hit, becoming the 17th player (and the third-youngest) to reach the mark. He announced his retirement after the 1993 season. The Brewers retired his number the next year. Yount was elected to the Wisconsin Athletic Hall of Fame in 1995. He was elected to the Baseball Hall of Fame in 1999, his first year of eligibility. That same year, he was included in the balloting for the Major League Baseball All-Century Team, finishing fifth among shortstops.

Yount holds Brewers career records for games, at-bats, runs, hits, doubles, triples, RBIs, total bases, walks and strikeouts. He was the last active major leaguer to have been a teammate of Hank Aaron (1975–1976). He posted a career .285 batting average with 251 home runs, 3,142 hits, 1,632 runs scored, 583 doubles, 126 triples, 1,406 RBI, 271 stolen bases and 966 walks. His 11,008 career at-bats is the ninth-most in Major League Baseball history (through the end of the 2020 season), and he ranks 20th on the all-time hit list. His three All-Star appearances are tied with Ferguson Jenkins for the second-fewest of any Hall of Famer from the All-Star Game era, and he won a second MVP Award in 1989 without making the All-Star Team.

Coaching career
Yount served as first base coach and bench coach for the Arizona Diamondbacks from 2002 to 2004. He resigned after the dismissal of Arizona manager Bob Brenly. He, Hank Aaron, Warren Spahn and Bob Uecker threw out the ceremonial first pitches at the 2002 Major League Baseball All-Star Game at Miller Park.

In 2005, Brewers manager Ned Yost convinced Dale Sveum, a teammate of Yount's, to become Milwaukee's new third base coach. Yount followed suit a few weeks later, accepting a post as the Brewers' bench coach. In November 2006, Yount announced he would not return to the team as bench coach for the 2007 season. However, on September 15, 2008, Sveum, by now the team's manager, chose Yount as his bench coach.

In 2012, when Sveum was named the Chicago Cubs new manager, rumors quickly spread that Sveum would ask Yount to coach with him, even though the Brewers and Cubs had become bitter rivals. Sveum very quickly confirmed that he was not even considering such a move. As of 2014, Yount is a special instructor in spring training for the Brewers.

Legacy
Yount is widely considered to be the greatest player in Brewers history. His 77.3 bWAR is 17 points higher than anyone else in franchise history. Yount is the only Brewer to win multiple MVP awards and one of three members of the franchise to reach 3,000 hits (Paul Molitor and Hank Aaron) and the only member of the franchise to do it solely as a Brewer. Yount is also the Brewers’ all-time leader in games, hits, at-bats, plate appearances, runs, doubles, triples, runs batted in, and walks.

Yount remains a popular figure in Milwaukee and has made numerous appearances at Brewers On Deck, the team’s annual preseason fan-fest. Yount’s number 19 is one of six numbers retired by the Brewers. His statue on the grounds of American Family Field is one of just four such statues erected by the Brewers. Yount was a charter member of the Milwaukee Brewers Wall of Honor when it was created in 2014.

Personal life

Yount met his wife Michele at Taft High School and they have been married since 1979.

Yount's brother Larry was a pitcher and was briefly called up to play in the major leagues. While taking his warmup tosses for his debut as a Houston Astros reliever in 1971, he experienced elbow pain. He never threw an official pitch in any MLB game. Yount's son Dustin played baseball in the minor leagues for several years. Yount's nephew Austin Yount played professional baseball for the Dodgers organization. Another nephew, Cody Yount, played college baseball for Pepperdine University.

Since retiring from baseball, Yount has increased his participation in two of his other passions, professional motorcycle and auto racing. In June 2008, Yount announced the creation of a new all-natural lemonade drink, Robinade. A portion of the proceeds of the sales goes to charity. Yount sometimes goes hunting with Sveum. While hunting in Arizona in 2012, Yount accidentally shot Sveum with pellets in the back and ear. Sveum's injuries were minor.

In 2012, Yount became a minority owner of the Lakeshore Chinooks of the Northwoods League, a collegiate summer baseball league. The Chinooks play at Kapco Park at Concordia University Wisconsin where the right field fence is 319 feet in his honor.

In 2014, Yount was honored with the "Lombardi Award of Excellence" from the Vince Lombardi Cancer Foundation. The award was created to honor Lombardi's legacy, and is awarded annually to an individual who exemplifies the spirit of the acclaimed football coach.

On October 20, 2018, Yount threw out the first pitch before Game 7 of the National League Championship Series between the Dodgers and Brewers.

See also

List of Major League Baseball career home run leaders
List of Major League Baseball doubles records
DHL Hometown Heroes
List of Major League Baseball career hits leaders
List of Major League Baseball career doubles leaders
List of Major League Baseball career triples leaders
List of Major League Baseball career runs scored leaders
List of Major League Baseball career runs batted in leaders
List of Major League Baseball career stolen bases leaders
List of Major League Baseball career total bases leaders
List of Major League Baseball annual doubles leaders
List of Major League Baseball annual triples leaders
List of Major League Baseball players who spent their entire career with one franchise
3,000 hit club
List of Major League Baseball players to hit for the cycle
Yount Monument

References

External links

, or Retrosheet

American sportsmen
Major League Baseball players with retired numbers
1955 births
Living people
Major League Baseball bench coaches
Major League Baseball center fielders
Major League Baseball first base coaches
Major League Baseball shortstops
American League All-Stars
American League Most Valuable Player Award winners
Gold Glove Award winners
National Baseball Hall of Fame inductees
Silver Slugger Award winners
Arizona Diamondbacks coaches
Milwaukee Brewers coaches
Milwaukee Brewers players
Newark Co-Pilots players
Baseball players from Illinois
People from Danville, Illinois
William Howard Taft Charter High School alumni